Franklin Junior High School is a public middle school in Franklin, Ohio, part of the Franklin City School District. The building was built in 1921 for grades 6-12. In 1948 the building became a four-year high school until 1954, when the Hampton Bennett School was opened. It remained a high school (grades 10-12) until 1969, when Franklin High School (Franklin, Ohio) was built. The building then became Franklin Junior High School housing grades 7 and 8.

Demographics 

Enrollment (2013-2014): Grade 7, 264; Grade 8, 212; Total: 476

Ethnic composition (2013-2014): 96.4% White; 1.3% Hispanic; 2.1% Multiracial; .03% Black.

References

High schools in Warren County, Ohio